The Cambridge Ring was an experimental local area network architecture developed at the Computer Laboratory, University of Cambridge starting in 1974 and continuing into the 1980s. It was a ring network with a theoretical limit of 255 nodes (though such a large number would have badly affected performance), around which cycled a fixed number of packets. Free packets would be "loaded" with data by a machine wishing to send, marked as received by the destination machine, and "unloaded" on return to the sender; thus in principle, there could be as many simultaneous senders as packets. The network ran over twin twisted-pair cabling (plus a fibre-optic section).

There are strong similarities between the Cambridge Ring and an earlier ring network developed at Bell Labs based on a design by John R. Pierce.  That network used T1 lines at bit rate of 1.544 MHz and accommodating 522 bit messages (data plus address).

People associated with the project include Andy Hopper, David Wheeler, Maurice Wilkes, and Roger Needham.

In 2002, the Computer Laboratory launched a graduate society called the Cambridge Computer Lab Ring named after the Cambridge Ring.

See also
 Cambridge Distributed Computing System
 Internet in the United Kingdom § History
 JANET
 NPL network
 Packet switching
 Token Ring
 University of London Computer Centre

References

External links
 Cambridge Ring Hardware
 Cambridge Fast Ring
 Cambridge Backbone Ring Hardware
 Cambridge Computer Lab Ring
 

1974 introductions
Experimental computer networks
History of computing in the United Kingdom
Local area networks
Network topology
University of Cambridge Computer Laboratory